Zhang Kailin was the defending champion, but lost in the first round to Xun Fangying.

Zheng Saisai won the title, defeating Zarina Diyas in the final, 7–5, 6–4.

Seeds

Draw

Finals

Top half

Bottom half

References
Main Draw

Kunming Open - Singles